Donald Duck: The Complete Daily Newspaper Comics is a series of hardcover books collecting the complete run of the Disney Donald Duck comic strip, a daily newspaper comic strip drawn by the American comic artist Al Taliaferro. The comic strip debuted on February 7, 1938, and within eight weeks became the fastest growing syndicated comic strip worldwide. The publisher behind the project is IDW Publishing and their imprint, The Library of American Comics. The first book of the series was released on September 2, 2015.

Format

The books come in a hardcover format, which includes a sewn binding, linen bookmark and dust jacket. The landscape orientation of the books measures 11 in × 8.5 in (approximately 279 mm × 216 mm), which allows each comic strip to be reproduced as close to the original published size as possible. Each page accommodates three daily strips.

Only the supplementary material appears in full colour since the daily comic strips were first published in black-and-white in the newspapers. The strips are scanned from the original syndicate proofs of the Disney archives. It's printed on high quality acid-free paper stock. Each volume of the series has about 280 pages and contains close to 750 daily strips (the equivalent to a 2.5-year original newspaper run). Roughly ten pages of supplemental material are included, such as promotional art, portraits of the creators, and introductory essays by animation historian David Gerstein.

However, LoAC's venture seems to have ended with an incomplete run, as no further volumes have been published since 2019.

Volumes

Translated versions 

In 2019 the Italian publisher Panini Comics began to publish a translated version of this reprint series titled: "Donald Duck - Le Strisce Quotidiane Complete".

See also
Donald Duck: The Complete Sunday Comics
Silly Symphonies: The Complete Disney Classics
Walt Disney's Mickey Mouse

References

External links 

 Donald Duck - The Complete Daily Newspaper Comics at the INDUCKS
 Donald Duck'' Publisher's website - IDW Publishing - The Library of American Comics
 Inside look of Donald Duck - The Daily Newspaper Comics Vol. 1 Library of American Comics' YouTube channel
 Inside look of Donald Duck - The Daily Newspaper Comics Vol. 2 Library of American Comics' YouTube channel
 New York Journal of Books - Donald Duck: The Complete Daily Newspaper Comics, Vol. 1 - Review by Mark Squirek

The Library of American Comics publications
Comic strip collection books
Disney comic strips
Disney comics titles
Donald Duck comics
Donald Duck
Humor comics